U.S. Highway 10 (US 10) in North Dakota runs  from Interstate 94 (I-94)/US 52 near West Fargo east through Fargo before crossing the Red River of the North and entering Moorhead, Minnesota. US 10 serves as a primary east–west corridor through the Fargo–Moorhead (Main Avenue) and is concurrent with I-94 Business for its entire length in North Dakota.

Route description

US 10 begins as a four-lane highway with a median at a trumpet interchange with I-94/US 52 (exit 343) just west of West Fargo. Once entering West Fargo, US 10 passes to the north of Bonanzaville, USA, a history museum complex before entering the downtown area of West Fargo. Continuing east, US 10 enters Fargo at its intersection with 45th Street and then intersects I-29/US 81 (exit 65) at a partial cloverleaf interchange  later. East of this interchange, US 10 loses its median but remains two lanes each direction after intersecting 25th Street. After this intersection, US 10 curves slightly southeast and runs along the Northern Transcon railroad tracks, heading into downtown. In downtown Fargo, US 10 passes to the south of the former Fargo station, which is listed on the National Register of Historic Places. At the east end of downtown Fargo, US 10 intersects 2nd Street at a roundabout before crossing over the Red River of the North and into Moorhead, Minnesota, on the Veterans Memorial Bridge.

All of US 10 in North Dakota is part of the National Highway System, a network of highways that are considered essential to the country's economy, defense, and mobility by the Federal Highway Administration.

History
Prior to 1986, US 10 ran along I-94 into Montana. The route was decommissioned west of Fargo in 1986.

Major intersections

References

External links

10
 North Dakota
Transportation in Cass County, North Dakota